Youssef Rakha (born on 12 June 1976 in Cairo, Egypt) is an Egyptian writer. His work explores language and identity in the context of Cairo, and reflects connections with the Arab-Islamic canon and world literature. He has worked in many genres in both Arabic and English, and is known for his essays and poems as well as his novels.

Early life 
The only child of a formerly Marxist lawyer, Elsaid Rakha, and an English-to-Arabic translator, Labiba Saad, Rakha was born and grew up in Dokki, on the western bank of the Nile, where he lives with his family today. At the age of 17 he left Egypt for the UK, where he obtained a first class honours BA in English and Philosophy from Hull University in 1998. On his return he joined the staff of Al-Ahram Weekly, the Cairo-based English-language newspaper, where he has worked regularly since 1999.

Rakha's biography is sketched out in, among other sources, the introduction to Beirut39: New Writing from the Arab World edited by Samuel Shimon, Starkey's chapter in Studying Modern Arabic Literature (footnote 4), Banipal online and Pro Helvetia's Territory Crossings.

Career

Novels 
In October 2022, Graywolf Press bought Rakha's first novel to be written in English, tentatively titled The Dissenters.

Rakha's first novel is The Book of the Sultan's Seal: Strange Incidents from History in the City of Mars. First published in 2011 as Kitab at-Tugra: Gharaib at-Tarikh fi Madinat al-Marrikh (Arabic: كتاب الطغرى: غرائب التاريخ في مدينة المريخ), the book is studied for its innovative use of Arabic, its postmodern take on the theme of the caliphate, its reimagining of the city of Cairo and its possible significance in the history of Arabic literature. It won the Banipal Seif Ghobash Prize for Paul Starkey’s English translation in 2015, and was published in French in 2016.

For academic interest in The Book of the Sultan's Seal, see Paul Starkey's chapter in Studying Modern Arabic Literature, Benjamin Koerber's paper in the Journal of Arabic Literature, and Anton Shammas's remark on the English publisher's website. For the Banipal Prize, see the Banipal Trust site. For the French translation, by Philippe Vigreux, see .

Since 2011 Rakha has completed two other novels in a proposed trilogy on the January Revolution, The Crocodiles (Arabic: التماسيح) and Paulo (Arabic: باولو). The latter was longlisted for the Arabic Booker in 2017 (the IPAF longlist for 2017) and won the 2017 Sawiris Cultural Award for Best Novel in January 2018.

Other work 
Rakha is also known as a photographer and the editor of a bilingual literature and photography site named after his first novel, The Sultan's Seal: Cairo's Coolest Cosmopolitan Hotel. His photography is featured on Mada Masr Berfrois, P1xels and Bidoun. His site has helped to introduce significant young writers in Arabic like the Libyan Ali Latife, the Algerian Salah Badis, the Palestinian Carol Sansour and the Egyptian Amgad Al Sabban; it has featured literary and photographic figures including Bezav Mahmod, Hilary Plum, Niall Griffiths and Pauls Toutonghi. A list of contributors can be found at sultansseal.com.

Prior to writing The Book of the Sultan's Seal, Rakha contributed to the coverage of Arab culture in English for many years as a reporter, literary critic and cultural editor. See the Al-Ahram Weekly archives for Rakha's numerous pieces in the Culture and Profile sections especially. He also wrote literary non-fiction and poetry in Arabic, for which he was chosen to participate in the Hay Festival Beirut39 event as one of the 39 best Arab writers under 40. His 2006 photo travelogue Beirut Shi Mahal (Arabic: بيروت شي محل), later translated into Polish, was nominated for the Lettre Ulysses Award for the Art of Reportage. For the Polish translation of the Beirut travelogue see Dobra Literatura.

As an English-language essayist and short fiction writer, Rakha has also contributed to numerous publications in the US and the UK. Publications in which he has written include, among many others, The Atlantic, The New York Times, The White Review, Guernica and The Kenyon Review.

Coverage 
News outlets that have covered Rakha's work include Reuters, Qantara.de, AL-BAB,, The National, Die Welt and Der Spiegel. English language reviews of Rakha's books and interviews occasioned by his work have appeared in, among other outlets, Granta, Publishers Weekly, Words Without Borders, Reorient, The New York Review of Books and Music and Literature.

Rakha is a well-known literary figure in Cairo and Beirut. His work has received regular in-depth coverage in the press since 2006. Arabic newspapers and media outlets that covered Youssef Rakha include Al-Ahram, Akhbar Al-Adab, Al-Akhbar, As-Safir, Al-Quds Al-Arabi, Al-Araby, Mada Masr, Independent Arabia, Al-Mustaqbal, Al-Hayat, An-Nahar, raseef22.com and 24.UE.

Books published 

Azhar ash-shams (Arabic: أزهار الشمس; Flowers of the Sun), short stories, Cairo: Dar Sharqiyat, 1999.
Beirut shi mahal (Arabic: بيروت شي محل; Beirut Some Place), photo travelogue, Alexandria: Amkenah Books, 2006.  Reviews of Beirut shi mahal appeared in, among other Arabic newspapers, Al-Ahram Al-Ittihad and Asharq Al-Awsat. The text was extracted in German translation in Lettre International 74.
Bourguiba ala madad (Arabic: بورقيبة على مضض; Bourguiba Reluctantly), part two of Beirut shi mahal (without photos), Beirut: Riyad El-Rayyes, 2008. 
Shamal al qahira gharb al filibbin (Arabic: شمال القاهرة غرب الفلبين; North of Cairo, West of the Philippines), travel essays, Beirut: Riyad El-Rayyes, 2009. 
Kull amakinina (Arabic: كل أماكننا; All Our Places), poems and essays, Cairo: Dar Al-Ain, 2010. 
The Book of the Sultan's Seal: Strange Incidents from History in the City of Mars (Arabic: كتاب الطغرى: غرائب التاريخ في مدينة المريخ), novel, Cairo: Dar Al-Shorouk, 2011. . Beirut: Arab Institute for Research and Publishing, 2018. . USA: Interlink, 2015. . Geneva: Éditions Zoé, 2016. 
The Crocodiles (Arabic: التماسيح), novel, Beirut: Dar Al-Saqi, 2012. . New York: Seven Stories Press, 2015. 
Paulo (Arabic: باولو), novel, Cairo-Beirut-Tunis: Dar Al-Tanwir, 2016. 
Arab Porn, essay (ebook only), 60Pages (long-form collective), 2016. ASIN B01J4YMPZK. Berlin: Matthes & Seitz, 2017. 
Barra and Zaman: Reading Egyptian Modernity in Shadi Abdel Salam’s The Mummy, essay, London: Palgrave Pivot (Studies in Arab Cinema), 2020. 
Walakinna Qalbi: Mutanabbi al Alfiya al Thalitha (Arabic: ولكن قلبي: متنبي الألفية الثالثة; And Yet My Heart: Third Millennium Mutanabbi), 20 poems and a personal essay, with illustrations by Walid Taher (on a grant from the Arab Fund for Arts and Culture), Cairo-Beirut-Tunis: Dar Al-Tanwir, 2021. ISBN 978-977-828-060-9
Walakinna Qalbi: Ma ba'd al Mutanabbi (Arabic: ولكن قلبي: ما بعد المتنبي; And Yet My Heart: Post Mutanabbi), essays and poems, with illustrations by Walid Taher, Dammam: Dar Athar, 2022. ISBN 978-603-91904-5-5
Emissaries and Other Short Stories, London: Barakunan, 2023. ISBN 978-1-3999-3363-6

References

External links

1976 births
Egyptian writers
Living people